West Niagara Secondary School is a secondary school in Grimsby, Ontario, Canada, and operated by the District School Board of Niagara (DSBN). The school currently operates out of the old Grimsby Secondary School and Beamsville District Secondary School buildings, but is planned to move to a new location on the border of Grimsby and Lincoln at 5699 King Street, Beamsville, Ontario in 2023.

Construction delays 
The construction of the school has seen many delays, and was originally planned to open in September 2020. One of the more notable delays was the extensive soil cleanup required due to contaminants found on the site. The COVID-19 pandemic caused sufficient delay that the school would not open for the 2022–2023 school year. The Grimsby building is set to be closed once the West Niagara institution is opened.

See also 

 List of secondary schools in Ontario

References 

High schools in the Regional Municipality of Niagara
Grimsby, Ontario